Francis Lawrence Lukeman (June 20, 1885 – December 23, 1946), was a Canadian athlete. He was born in Montreal, Quebec.

Biography
In Stockholm at the 1912 Summer Olympics Lukeman finished fourth in the pentathlon but was awarded the bronze medal after Jim Thorpe of the United States was disqualified from the gold medal. Thorpe's disqualification was eventually overturned but Lukeman were permitted to retain his bronze medal.

In the 100 metres at the 1908 Summer Olympics in London Lukeman took second place in his first-round heat with a time of 11.7 seconds. He did not advance to the semifinals.

He won in his preliminary heat of the 200 metres, placing first overall.

Lukeman served in the Canadian Expeditionary Force in World War I, at various times in the 3rd Regiment Victoria Rifles of Canada, 14th Battalion (Royal Montreal Regiment), CEF, 242nd Battalion, CEF, which was absorbed into the Canadian Forestry Corps, where he served out the end of the war as an (Acting) Regimental Sergeant Major. He returned to Montreal after the war. "In his combat overseas, he was gassed twice. In 1945, he had his leg amputated and remained bedridden at the Sainte-Anne-de-Bellevue Military Hospital (Ste. Anne's Hospital), dying in 1946."

References

1885 births
1946 deaths
Olympic track and field athletes of Canada
Athletes (track and field) at the 1908 Summer Olympics
Athletes (track and field) at the 1912 Summer Olympics
Olympic bronze medalists for Canada
Canadian decathletes
Anglophone Quebec people
Athletes from Montreal
Canadian Army soldiers
Medalists at the 1912 Summer Olympics
Canadian military personnel of World War I
Olympic bronze medalists in athletics (track and field)
Olympic male pentathletes
Olympic decathletes